The 3rd Canadian Parliament was in session from March 26, 1874, until August 17, 1878. The membership was set by the 1874 federal election on January 22, 1874. It was dissolved prior to the 1878 election.

It was controlled by a Liberal Party majority under Prime Minister Alexander Mackenzie and the 2nd Canadian Ministry. The Official Opposition was the Conservative/Liberal-Conservative, first led by Sir John A. Macdonald.

The Speaker was Timothy Warren Anglin. See also List of Canadian electoral districts 1873-1882 for a list of the ridings in this parliament.

There were five sessions of the 3rd Parliament:

List of members

Following is a full list of members of the third parliament listed first by province, then by electoral district.

Electoral districts denoted by an asterisk (*) indicates that district was represented by two members.

British Columbia

Manitoba

One MP recontested his seat in a byelection, and was reelected.
Louis Riel was reelected in Provencher on September 3, 1874, upon the passage of a motion expelling him from the House of Commons.

New Brunswick

Two MPs recontested their seats in a byelection, and were reelected:
Timothy Warren Anglin was reelected in Gloucester on July 2, 1877.
Peter Mitchell was reelected in Northumberland on February 5, 1878.

Nova Scotia

Two MPs recontested their seats in byelections, and were reelected.
Thomas McKay was reelected in Colchester on December 17, 1874
Alfred Gilpin Jones was reelected in Halifax on January 29, 1878, on being named Minister of Militia and Defence.

Ontario

22 MPs recontested their seats in byelections, and were reelected 
William McGregor was reelected in Essex on October 22, 1874.
John Lorn McDougall was reelected in Renfrew South on October 24, 1874, and again on February 20, 1875.
Schuyler Shibley was reelected in Addington on October 28, 1874.
William Kerr was reelected in Northumberland West on November 17, 1874.
James Norris was reelected in Lincoln on November 17, 1874, and May 9, 1877.
James Lyons Biggar was reelected in Northumberland East on December 12, 1874.
George Turner Orton was reelected in Wellington Centre on December 13, 1874.
Charles Frederick Ferguson was reelected in Leeds North and Grenville North on December 16, 1874.
James MacLennan was reelected in Victoria North on December 22, 1874.
Josiah Burr Plumb was reelected in Niagara on December 22, 1874.
Herman Henry Cook was reelected in Simcoe North on December 26, 1874.
Sir John A. Macdonald was reelected in Kingston on December 29, 1874.
Nathaniel Higinbotham was reelected in Wellington North on March 18, 1875.
Aemilius Irving was reelected in Hamilton on May 20, 1875.
Andrew Trew Wood was reelected in Hamilton on May 20, 1875.
Edward Blake was reelected in Bruce South on June 2, 1875, after being named Minister of Justice.
Lachlan McCallum was reelected in Monck on June 22, 1875.
Alfred Hutchison Dymond was reelected in York North on June 29, 1875.
Andrew Monteith was reelected in Perth North on July 7, 1875.
Archibald McNab was reelected in Glengarry on July 31, 1876.
David Mills was reelected in Bothwell on November 15, 1876, after being named Minister of the Interior.
Joseph Merrill Currier was reelected in Ottawa on May 9, 1877.

Prince Edward Island

Quebec

Twelve MPs recontested their seats in byelections, and were reelected:
Félix Geoffrion was reelected in Verchères on July 25, 1874, after being named Minister of Inland Revenue.
Henry Aylmer was reelected in Richmond—Wolfe on December 4, 1874, after being named Receiver-General.
Louis François George Baby was reelected in Joliette on December 10, 1874.
Frederick Mackenzie was reelected in Montreal West on December 10, 1874.
Amable Jodoin was reelected in Chambly on December 30, 1874.
Hilaire Hurteau was reelected in L'Assomption on January 16, 1875.
Sixte Coupal dit la Reine was reelected in Napierville on June 19, 1875.
Bernard Devlin was reelected in Montreal Centre on November 26, 1875.
François Fortunat Rouleau was reelected in Dorchester on December 14, 1875.
Joseph-Édouard Cauchon was reelected in Quebec Centre on December 27, 1875, after being named President of the Privy Council.
Rodolphe Laflamme was reelected in Jacques Cartier on December 28, 1876, after being named Minister of Inland Revenue.
Hector-Louis Langevin was reelected in Charlevoix on March 23, 1877.

By-elections

References

Succession

03rd Canadian Parliament
1874 establishments in Canada
1878 disestablishments in Canada
1874 in Canada
1875 in Canada
1876 in Canada
1877 in Canada
1878 in Canada